Amblyodipsas polylepis, or the common purple-glossed snake, is a species of venomous rear-fanged snake in the Atractaspididae family.

Geographic range
It is endemic to the eastern and northern regions of southern Africa. More specifically, it is found in Angola, Namibia, Botswana, Democratic Republic of the Congo, Zambia, Mozambique, Zimbabwe, Malawi, Republic of South Africa, Tanzania, coastal Kenya, and Somalia.

Description
Dorsal scales smooth, without pits, arranged in 21 rows, which is more than any other species of Amblyodipsas as the specific epithet, polylepis, implies. Ventrals 163–212; anal divided; subcaudals 16–27, divided. In every other respect scalation is like Amblyodipsas unicolor.

Completely blackish brown. Total length ; tail .

References
Notes

Bibliography
 Bocage, J.V.B. 1873. Melanges herpétologiques. II. Sur quelques reptiles et batraciens nouveaux, rares ou peu connus d'Afrique occidentale. Journ. Acad. Sci. Lisboa 4:209-227.

Atractaspididae
Reptiles described in 1873